Nikola Eftimov (born 6 October 1968 in Skopje, Yugoslavia, now in North Macedonia) is a Macedonian fashion designer and visual artist.

He graduated at the Faculty of Fine Arts in Skopje (Graphic Art and Fashion Design, 1993) and completed the master studies at Accademia Italiana in Florence, Italy (Fashion as Art, “The Eccentric male costume in the last three centuries”, 1998). After the three years working experience (2006–09) as an academic manager and professor at Accademia Italiana Skopje, currently he is occupied with the researches for his PhD thesis. In October 2009 he started to teach at the Faculty for Art and Design, European University Skopje. He has a wide range of professional interests (fashion as art, fashion as communication, theory, and history of costume and fashion, experimental fashion  techniques, men's wear, theory of collection, haute couture, photography) and his work is focused on research of gender, cultural and social issues of the costume and fashion. From 1994 to 1997 he participates in group exhibitions of graphic art and drawing (1997, Macedonian Drawing ’96 – Award from the National and University Library Skopje).

The period between 1992 and 2010 is marked with work in the fields of fashion and costume design. In 2005, he won “The Coca-Cola light fashion design award” that enabled him presentation of the winning design in Florence and the position of professor at Accademia Italiana Bangkok (2005–2006).

Sani (Macedonian fashion journalist) wearing Eftimov's outfits. Photos by Ivan Blazev, 2003

Photos from the project “Entangled Fragments: ABC of Curatorial Black”, Nikola Eftimov, 2007

References

External links
Official website

1968 births
Living people
Artists from Skopje
Macedonian fashion designers